Qeshlaq-e Qarah Darreh may refer to various places in Iran:
Qeshlaq-e Qarah Darreh-ye Asam Khan Asad
Qeshlaq-e Qarah Darreh-ye Asam Khan Azadkhan
Qeshlaq-e Qarah Darreh-ye Asam Khan Hajj Sadallah
Qeshlaq-e Qarah Darreh-ye Asam Khan Khan Kishi
Qeshlaq-e Qarah Darreh-ye Asam Khan Safar Kandi
Qeshlaq-e Qarah Darreh-ye Asam Khan Tahraj
Qeshlaq-e Qarah Darreh-ye Aziz Rostam
Qeshlaq-e Qarah Darreh-ye Hajji Alish
Qeshlaq-e Qarah Darreh-ye Kahel Qeshlaq Farasat
Qeshlaq-e Qarah Darreh-ye Kahel va Qeshlaq-e Hajji Shahverdi